A delicacy is usually a rare and expensive food item that is considered highly desirable, sophisticated, or peculiarly distinctive within a given culture. Irrespective of local preferences, such a label is typically pervasive throughout a region. Often this is because of unusual flavors or characteristics or because it is rare or expensive compared to standard staple foods.

Delicacies vary per different countries, customs and ages. Flamingo tongue was a highly prized dish in ancient Rome, but is not commonly eaten in modern times. Lobsters were considered poverty food in North America until the mid-19th century when they started being treated, as they were in Europe, as a delicacy. Some delicacies are confined to a certain culture, such as fugu in Japan, bird's nest soup (made out of swiftlet saliva) in China, and ant larvae (escamoles) in Mexico or refer to specific local products, such as porcino, venison or anchovy.

Examples of delicacies

 Abalone (Bao Yu/Jeonbok/Awabi) – China; Taiwan; Korea; Japan
 Akutaq – Alaska, United States; Northern Canada; Siberia
 Alligator meat – Southern United States
 Alici, from the Gulf of Trieste near Barcola – Italy
 Balut – Philippines
 Biltong – Southern Africa
 Bird's nest soup – China
 Black-headed gull eggs – United Kingdom
 Black sausage (Mustamakkara) – Finland
 Bottarga – Mediterranean Basin
 Bourbon – Kentucky and Louisiana, United States
 Casu marzu – Sardinia, Italy
 Caviar – Russia; Azerbaijan; Iran
 Cempedak – Indonesia; Malaysia; Southern Thailand
 Champagne – Champagne region of France
 Conpoy – China
 Droëwors – Southern Africa
 Durian – Borneo; Sumatra
 East Asian giant salamander – China; Korea; Japan
 Escamol – Mexico City, Mexico
 Escargot – France
 European edible dormouse – Croatia; Slovenia
 Filet mignon – France
 Foie gras – Périgord region of France
 Fried-brain sandwich – Indiana, Ohio, and St. Louis, United States
 Fried tarantula – Skuon, Cambodia
 Fugu – Japan; Korea 
 Gyromitra esculenta – Scandinavia
 Guinea pig – Bolivia; Colombia; Ecuador; Peru
 Haggis – Scotland
 Hákarl – Iceland
 Huitlacoche – Mexico
 Hutki Shira – Sylhet, Bangladesh
 Iberian ham (Jamón ibérico) – Spain; Portugal
 Ikizukuri – Japan
 Jellyfish – East Asia; Southeast Asia
 Karasumi – Japan; Taiwan
 Kiviak – Greenland
 Kobe beef – Hyōgo Prefecture, Japan
 Kopi luwak – Indonesia
 Lobster – Maine, Massachusetts, and New York, United States; The Maritimes, Canada; Sabah, Malaysia
 Locust – Arabia; China; Israel; Jewish diaspora
 Matsusaka beef – Matsusaka and Mie Prefecture, Japan
 Moonshine – Scotland; Ireland; Appalachia
 Mud Creeper – Malaysia; Vietnam
 Ortolan bunting – France
 Pickled cucumber – northern and eastern Europe
 Quail eggs (including pickled quail eggs) – Brazil; Colombia; Denmark; Ecuador; Indonesia; Japan; Philippines; South Korea; Venezuela; Vietnam
 Raw oysters – Malaysia; France; United States; Korea
 Rocky Mountain oysters – Argentina; Canada; Mexico; Spain; United States
 Scallops – Galicia, Spain; Japan; Taiwan
 Sea cucumber – East Asia; Southeast Asia
 Shark fin soup – China; Taiwan
 Shiokara – Japan
 Shirako (milt) – Indonesia; Japan; Korea; Romania; Russia; Sicily, Italy
 Smalahove – Western Norway
 Snail caviar – France; Poland
 Snake soup – Guangdong, China; Hong Kong; Austria; France; United Kingdom; United States
 Spiny-tailed lizard - Arabia
 Surströmming – Sweden
 Truffle – Caucasus; Middle East; Southern Europe
 Tyrolean grey cheese – Austria

See also

 Acquired taste 
 Chinmi – Includes a list of Japanese delicacies
 Delicatessen
 Shaxian delicacies – a style of cuisine from Sha County, Sanming, Fujian, China
 Specialty foods

References

Works cited

Further reading

External links

Cuisine